Liubinbu Township is a township situated on the northeastern side of Yanqing District, Beijing, China. It shares border with Qianjiadian Town to its north, Sihai Town to its east, Yongning Town to its south, and Xiangying Township to its west. It had 4,497 people residing within its boundaries in 2020.

Geography 
Liubinbu Township sits inside of a basin within Yan Mountain Range. S323 Yanliu Road goes through the town.

History

Administrative divisions 
So far in 2021, Liubinbu Township is divided into 17 subdivisions, of those 1 is a community and 16 are villages. They are, by order of their Administrative Division Codes:

Gallery

See also 
 List of township-level divisions of Beijing

References

Yanqing District
Township-level divisions of Beijing